Baikal International Airport (Mezhdunarodnyy aeroport "Baykal"), formerly Ulan-Ude Airport (Aeroport Ulan-Ude)  is an international airport located  west of Ulan-Ude, Russia. The airport has two terminals with customs and border control facilities with a capacity of 400 passengers per hour. In 2021, the airport served 540,094 passengers on more than 20 scheduled international and domestic destinations. The airport is named after the nearby Lake Baikal.

History

1925–1971
In 1925, the airport began its first passenger service with the first aircraft traveling from Moscow to Beijing, with pilots Volkovoyinov and Polyakov participating in it. On 1 August 1926, the first flights started: Ulan-Ude – Ulan-Bator; in addition, the airport was a place for technical landing for flights from Irkutsk, Chita, Moscow, and Vladivostok. In 1931, the construction of the first air terminal began, where in 1935, the construction finished. From 1966, the airport began to accept Antonov An-24 and Tupolev Tu-104 aircraft.

1971–1991
In 1971, a new runway was constructed which optimized the airport to accept larger aircraft like the Ilyushin Il-18 from Moscow, where from 1980 to 1981, the runway was expanded by 800 metres, and it opened by accepting the first Tupolev Tu-154. In 1983, the first terminal stopped operating due to the opening of a new one. From September to October 1983, the airport was accepting transit flights from and to Chita, due to its closing, because of the runway re-construction. In 1988 and 1989, the airport started to serve a number of transit flights, including the international (Moscow – Pyongyang, including Air Koryo; Moscow – Ulan-Bator), shifted from Irkutsk, due to runway re-construction. That situation led to a huge optimization of the airport, where every day the airport accepted 70 flights, which 30 of them were served by Tupolev Tu-154. In 1990, the airport transferred 800,000 passengers in a year.

1991–2006
Until 2011, the airport was serving flights from Irkutsk and Chita when these airports had issues with construction or weather. There were no international flights until 2011.

2006–2011
 
In 2006, the airport underwent an overhaul of its runway, costing RUR 330 million (US$10 million). In 2007, the airport underwent renovations of its taxiways and parking areas, at a cost of RUR 230 million.

2011–2017

In March 2011, the renovation of the external terminal complex began, after when Metropol bought the airport. The reconstruction finished in August 2011. Till now in the airport are in process small reconstructions inside the terminal complex. The last renovation was expanding the second floor and making it a boarding zone, in addition the zone of check-up and passport check moved to the second floor. Also, the arrival and departure exits and entrances are now in different locations.

2017-today
In September 2014, the government of Russian Federation, which owns the airport infrastructure, announced plans to build a new runway, with a cost of $157 million, parallel to the current. The latter will become a taxiway.

The runway commenced its service at night of 12 December 2018, with a flight of S7 Airlines to Beijing.

In September 2017, the airport was sold by Metropol to Novaport. Novaport allowed the airport to get the status of open sky, moreover, the airport will allow more ambitious plans, like construction of a new passenger terminal. Currently, due to unlimited status of open sky, international airlines such as Air China, China Eastern Airlines, Lucky Air, MIAT Mongolian Airlines and Spring Airlines are interested in starting flights to Ulan Ude. Moreover, Russia's flag carrier Aeroflot, announced that it will resume the flights to Ulan-Ude in 2018 or 2019, the plans are delaying due to FIFA-2018, also the airline explained the reason of exiting from this route, by low-quality runway.

On 7 December 2017, the Buryatia governor Alexey Tsydenov announced that by the end of 2018, the construction of the new terminal will commence. The land for construction is being found, currently, the project is being created, therefore, the final amount will be calculated for the construction financing. The first stage will be the full reconstruction of the current terminal, and then by 2022, the new terminal will be constructed. Construction of the new terminal began on 28 April 2018, and is about to finish in 2023.

Airlines and destinations

Annual passenger traffic

Busiest routes

References

External links

Baikal International Airport Official website 

Airports in Buryatia
Airports built in the Soviet Union
Buildings and structures in Ulan-Ude
Novaport